The Manifestation is the seventh album release from experimental indie rock band, Six Organs of Admittance, released in 2004. It contains the lengthy single release of "Manifestation" from 2000, and a new six-part suite, The Six Stations, composed by Ben Chasny as he improvised around the noise produced by playing on a turntable the etching of the sun that appears on the back of the original single.

Track listing
"The Manifestation"
"The Six Stations"

2004 albums
Six Organs of Admittance albums